Jorma Karvonen (born 16 October 1949) is a Finnish ski-orienteering competitor and world champion. He won a gold medal at the first World Ski Orienteering Championships in Hyvinkää in 1975 in the relay event with the Finnish team (with Pekka Pökälä, Heimo Taskinen and Olavi Svanberg). He also received an individual silver medal in 1975, and a bronze medal at the 1977 World Championships in Avesta.

At the 1978 World Orienteering Championships in Kongsberg he won a bronze medal with the Finnish relay team.

See also
 Finnish orienteers
 List of orienteers
 List of orienteering events

References

1949 births
Living people
Finnish orienteers
Male orienteers
Foot orienteers
Ski-orienteers
World Orienteering Championships medalists